The 2005 Fórmula Truck season was the 10th Fórmula Truck season. It began on March 13 at Caruaru and ended on December 11 at Brasília.

Calendar and results
All races were held in Brazil.

References

External links
  

2005 in Brazilian motorsport
2005